Arlene McCarthy OBE (born 10 October 1960, Belfast, Northern Ireland) was a Member of the European Parliament for North West England for the Labour Party from 1994 to 2014.

Career before politics
McCarthy graduated from South Bank Polytechnic (now London South Bank University) in 1983 with BA (Hons) proceeding to attend the Free University of Berlin and then later attending the University of Manchester to conduct PhD studies.

After completing studies McCarthy was employed as a lecturer in International Politics and Regional Studies at the Free University of Berlin, and was also employed at the European Parliament working for the Socialist Group.

Upon returning to Britain McCarthy worked as the Principal European Liaison Officer at Kirklees Metropolitan Borough Council, until her election to the European Parliament.

European Parliament
First elected in 1994, McCarthy was re-elected in 1999 to represent the newly formed North West England constituency. Having represented the same constituency since, she was top of the list of candidates from the Labour Party at the 2009 European elections.

McCarthy held a number of positions within Parliament, being a member of the Party of European Socialists, she sat in the Progressive Alliance of Socialists and Democrats group. McCarthy was Chair of the Committee on Internal Market and Consumer Protection and since 2009 served as the vice-chair of the Committee on Economic and Monetary Affairs.

In January 2014 McCarthy announced she would not be seeking re-election in the June 2014 European Parliament Election.

She was appointed Officer of the Order of the British Empire (OBE) in the 2015 New Year Honours.

Footnotes

References
European Regional Development Strategies: Responses of Two Northern Regions, Local Government Policy Making, Vol.20, No 5, May 1994

External links
Official website
Arlene McCarthy MEP and Software Patents (FFII page detailing her proposing legislation allowing the patenting of software)
Another FFII page
Profile at European Parliament website  

1960 births
Living people
Alumni of London South Bank University
Politicians from Belfast
Labour Party (UK) MEPs
MEPs for England 1994–1999
MEPs for England 1999–2004
MEPs for England 2004–2009
MEPs for England 2009–2014
Officers of the Order of the British Empire
20th-century women MEPs for England
21st-century women MEPs for England